Fiaschi is a surname. Notable people with the surname include:

 César Fiaschi (1891–1954), Argentine film actor
 Eleonora Elisa Fiaschi Tennant (1893–1963), Australian political activist
 Emilio Fiaschi (1858–1941), Italian sculptor

See also
 Fieschi family